In geometry, Apollonius's theorem is a theorem relating the length of a median of a triangle to the lengths of its sides. 
It states that "the sum of the squares of any two sides of any triangle equals twice the square on half the third side, together with twice the square on the median bisecting the third side".

Specifically, in any triangle  if  is a median, then 

It is a special case of Stewart's theorem. From the fact that the diagonals of a parallelogram bisect each other, the theorem is equivalent to the parallelogram law.

The theorem is named for the ancient Greek mathematician Apollonius of Perga.

Proof 

The theorem can be proved as a special case of Stewart's theorem, or can be proved using vectors (see parallelogram law). The following is an independent proof using the law of cosines.

Add the first and third equations to obtain

as required.

See also

References

External links 

 
 David B. Surowski: Advanced High-School Mathematics. p. 27

Euclidean geometry
Articles containing proofs
Theorems about triangles